The Never Ending Tour is the popular name for Bob Dylan's endless touring schedule since June 7, 1988. In 2014, his schedule ran from March to December.

Background
The first leg of the tour taking place solely in Japan was announced on Christmas Eve 2013, with large gaps between several dates. Three extra dates in Tokyo were eventually announced in late February 2014.

It was announced via Dylan's official website that he and his band would perform two shows in Hawaii in April, one taking place in Maui and the second taking place in Honolulu. This was the first time that Dylan had performed in the state in twenty-two years; he last performed there in April 1992.

Dates of a European tour were slowly published through several unofficial Dylan websites before being officially announced on BobDylan.com in March 2014. The European leg began in Cork, Ireland, at the Live at the Marquee Festival and his appearance was met with relatively positive reviews.

On May 26 a six-city Australian tour was announced, with several extra dates being added later throughout the early (Southern Hemisphere) winter. The same announcement revealed two New Zealand shows, bypassing the city of Auckland. On August 18 a one-off small club show at the Tivoli in Brisbane was announced, billed as a "once in a life-time concert performance".

The final leg of the tour, taking place in North America throughout the autumn and early winter, was announced on August 27, one day after the announcement of The Bootleg Series Vol. 11: The Complete Basement Tapes.

Set list
This set list is representative of the performance on October 24, 2014 in Los Angeles, California. It does not represent all concerts for the duration of the tour.

Set One
"Things Have Changed"
"She Belongs to Me"
"Beyond Here Lies Nothin'"
"Workingman's Blues #2"
"Waiting for You"
"Duquesne Whistle"
"Pay in Blood"
"Tangled Up in Blue"
"Love Sick"

Set Two
"High Water (For Charley Patton)"
"Simple Twist of Fate"
"Early Roman Kings"
"Forgetful Heart"
"Spirit on the Water"
"Scarlet Town"
"Soon After Midnight"
"Long and Wasted Years"

Encore
"Blowin' in the Wind"
"Stay With Me"

Tour dates

Notes

Reception
Dylan's 2014 leg of the Never Ending Tour has been met with almost completely favorable responses and reviews. Many complimenting his quality of shows, now that he has focused on one particular set list.

In Japan Dylan was applauded for his selection and arrangement of the songs in his current set list, with one reviewer for the Japan Times in Tokyo "This [Dylan] is an artist still forever pushing the envelope, with one rendition of a song only rarely the same as any other". In Osaka Dylan's vocal approach and quality were praised and a review called his vocal ability "solid".

When Dylan visited the island of Hawaii straight after a run of concerts in Japan he was praised for "honey coated" vocals and the ability of his backing band. It was also noted how Dylan can make a concert feel "essential" for a fan whilst not particularly engaging with the audience.

Dylan's return to Europe started with two shows in Ireland. At his Dublin concert it was noticed that Dylan still has the ability to attract a crowd of all ages. One reviewer, Aine Byrne, was slightly taken aback by some "unrecognisable" arrangements, the poor sound at the venue and the lack of interaction between Dylan and his audience. However, she stated "[Dylan] may be old and beat up, but the man has some punch in him yet". She also noted that the venue was full and praised the quality of the backing band. "A good concert, not the best, but to see and hear a living legend playing on form was a very pleasant experience indeed". The Irish Mirror also called the concert a "rich theatrical experience". In Bucharest the choice of instruments that the band chose to use to back Dylan were applauded. The show was called "Sometimes tender, sometimes playful and sometimes formidable – but always with venerable composure and poetic dignity". In Vienna it was noted that Dylan is obviously comfortable with the material he is now playing and the order in which songs played was helped the sound and of the concert to create an "authentic theatre experience". In Poland it was noted that Dylan's secondary 'festival' set list featured minimal materiel from the last few albums, the inclusion of a large amount of recent material became standard feature in set lists of recent years. In Kristiansand, the inclusion of "Girl from the North Country" was met with a highly positive response, while the concert itself was deemed average, with on-and-off vocal performances. This kind of report on his vocals lacking the smoothness of earlier in the year continued to the end of the tour.

The opening concert of the Oceania tour in New Zealand was met with the same very favourable reaction that met his tour in Japan. A reviewer from the Waikato Times noted the theatrical edge and stated that "Finally, Dylan and the band closed, leaving in their wake an awestruck audience, a standing ovation and the incomparable feeling of having witnessed a musical great – perhaps not in his prime, but by no means past it". The second concert in Hamilton was met with the same kind of response. It was noted that a collection of microphones and dim lighting obscured the view of Dylan. A review of Dylan's first concert in Australia at Perth's Riverside theatre by the Sydney Morning Herald noted that Dylan showed the Perth audience that he is "still on top of his game". The review made light that "He sang truly. This was as good as perfection, and there were diamonds, and little rust". In Melbourne the show was praised for its intimate feel "It was a night to remember, though maybe not for the exact reasons we had expected. Rather, the aim seemed to be keeping everything as cosy as possible, inviting us to have a glimpse at Dylan's out-of-time universe for a couple of hours. Nothing more, and nothing less". Dylan's main Brisbane show was also met with a positive response. The review also noted the dim lighting "He no longer plays guitar but occasionally piano, and under dim lighting – no doubt to discourage fans from sneaking a video souvenir". Dylan performed a second, more intimate show in Brisbane and The Brisbane Times stated "Dylan was magnificent, backed by a band that switched between musical genres with effortless skill". The positive reviews continued for Dylan's for the Canberra concert; "Looking dapper at 73,  Dylan did not disappoint". The Reviews of Sydney's series of concerts were also looked upon favourably, with the Brisbane Times stating "From evangelical to dirty roots, the veteran artist is in superb form". The Oceania tour ended with a third concert in New Zealand. It was noted that although the set list of recent songs would disappoint the fans expecting early material however the review was favourable and noted "but we should be pleased that the creative Dylan has made it back to play his 21st show in New Zealand".

References

External links
BobLinks – Comprehensive log of concerts and set lists
BobDylan.com – Bob Dylan's Official Website Tour Page
Bjorner's Still on the Road – Information on recording sessions and performances

Bob Dylan concert tours
2014 concert tours